The 1980–1981 Armagh Prison Dirty Protest occurred at the all-women Armagh Prison in Northern Ireland, where prisoners refused to bathe, use the lavatory, empty chamber pots, or clean their cells. This resulted in unsanitary conditions and increased abuse at the hands of the prison guards. The protest borrowed tactics previously used by male Irish republican prisoners in Long Kesh Prison (informally known as the Maze Prison), that had started in 1978.

Special Category Status

Since a hunger strike of 40 IRA prisoners in 1972, prisoners convicted as members of the Irish Republican Army (IRA) had been given Special Category Status by the British government. This Special Category Status, which classified them as political prisoners rather than as members of the general population, entitled them to certain privileges.

These benefits, including the right to wear one's own clothes, to be exempt from prison work, and to gather with other political prisoners for free discourse, allowed the IRA and other paramilitary groups to distinguish themselves from other prisoners and to maintain their command structure in prison.  Beginning in 1976, however, the British government introduced its policy of "criminalization”, which aimed to portray the prisoners as criminals rather than political activists. As part of this policy the Special Category Status was rescinded for all prisoners convicted after 1 March 1976. This withdrawal of special treatment for IRA prisoners caused an uproar both inside and outside the prison system, who now found themselves forced to wear prison uniforms, engage in prison labour, restrict their visits both with fellow prisoners and with visitors from the outside, and deal with prison authorities individually rather than through their command structure.  As a result, violence between prisoners and prison officials escalated, tensions within the prison rose, and a long string of protests aiming at a reinstatement of Special Category Status began.

Blanket protests

The first in a long line of Long Kesh prison protests, the blanket protest was begun on 14 September 1976 by a prisoner named Kieran Nugent. Nugent was the first political prisoner to be convicted after the removal of Special Category Status. Upon entrance to prison, he refused to wear the standard uniform and instead chose to wear his blanket as a garment and, at times, go naked. During this protest, members of the IRA and Irish National Liberation Army (INLA) followed suit, donning blankets rather than wearing prison uniform and thus protesting their treatment.

This protest resulted in further punishment. The prison rules stated that prisoners had to be clothed in a uniform for all visits with family members and friends and that, if one wanted to leave his cell at any point in time, he was to be wearing his prisoner's outfit.  As a result of their refusal to wear any issued prison clothing, those prisoners who protested "on the blanket" forfeited their four monthly visits with the outside world, were confined to their cells 24 hours a day, were forced to sleep in rooms with no furniture, and were fed insufficient food. Throughout this protest, tension between prisoners and wardens/guards continued to increase, resulting in the targeted assassinations of prison guards by members of the IRA.

Long Kesh dirty protests

As tensions grew within the prison between guards and prisoners, the number of attacks by guards increased, especially during the prisoners' daily trips to the lavatory or showers. In March 1978, these attacks eventually led to prisoners refusing to leave their cells for fear of being brutally beaten, yet being refused basins to wash themselves in.  A few months later, a brutal attack on a fellow prisoner led to a mass revolt within Long Kesh, as prisoners destroyed their cells and furniture, refusing to leave after the damage was done.  Unable to clear the cells, wardens left the prisoners trapped in the small rooms and, as a result, what had previously been only a blanket protest morphed into the first of the dirty protests.

In the dirty protests, prisoners who were suddenly unable to empty their chamber pots began smearing their own excrement on the walls of their cells (to mitigate the build-up of vermin) and dumping their urine down cracks in the floor and out windows. Prison officials cleaned the cells sporadically after temporarily removing the protesting prisoners. After a few months, the numbers of prisoners involved in the dirty protest was between 250 and 300.

After two years of protest, the prisoners decided to issue what they called the "Five Demands". These demands, were:

 The right not to wear a prison uniform
 The right not to do prison work
 The right of free association with other prisoners, and to organise educational and recreational pursuits
 The right to one visit, one letter and one parcel per week
 Full restoration of remission lost through the protest.

Armagh protest

The only women's prison in Northern Ireland, Armagh Prison was built in the late eighteenth century and had served as a holding place for Irish republican prisoners. In 1975, the population of Irish republican women prisoners reached a high of 120; but a population  between 60 and 70 was more common, usually women under the age of 25. Unlike the male prisoners, female republicans were allowed to wear their own clothing and, as such, were never forced to go "on the blanket" in protest of prison uniforms.  They did, however, hold their own "no work" protest, during which they refused to engage in any of the tasks which were set to them by wardens, in protest of the removal of Special Category Status and the corresponding loss of privileges similar to that of the men in Long Kesh. In addition, three female prisoners in Armagh participated in the Long Kesh hunger strike of 1980, which ended unsuccessfully.

7 February 1980

While the women of Armagh prison had been operating under a "no work" protest for quite a while to no avail, the events of 7 February 1980 served as a catalyst that would escalate their protest into a "dirty" one, mirroring the actions of their male counterparts in Long Kesh.  After weeks of being served poor food, the women were told that their lunch would be chicken and apple pie.  As they arrived to begin eating, the warden informed them that their cells were to be searched during their meal; this warning was largely ignored due to the unusually good food they were being served, and the searches went on unimpeded.  During the meal, however, an increased number of guards, some rumoured to have been brought over from Long Kesh for extra reinforcement, entered the room, causing panic and an uprising among the women.  This panic led to a prisoners' rebellion, during which the women were locked into two mass cells as their own cells were torn apart looking for clothing which could be identified as military-like uniforms.  After the search was completed, the women were returned to their cells but were also informed that they were to be "Adjudicated" for their roles in the riot; they were subsequently beaten by guards in riot gear and confined to their cells for 24 hours, during which time they were denied access to the bathroom and given little food to eat.  Over the course of their confinement, their chamber pots began to fill, forcing the women to dump the urine out of spy holes in their doors (these were subsequently nailed shut) and to throw the excrement out their windows (which were then boarded up).  By 12 February 1980, it was official: Armagh Dirty Protest had begun.

Prison Conditions
Once underway, the dirty protest changed the conditions within the prison from bad to worse, adding filth and stench to the already nearly insurmountable obstacles to daily life within the walls of Armagh.  In a letter smuggled out to family members, one protester described the conditions as follows:Our walls are covered in excrement. There was nothing else to do with it. You can’t pile it up in the corner – that would be unbearable. This way it’s not half as bad.  It dries and the smell isn’t so bad after an hour or so. The urine is the worst smell. You’ll probably find that hard to believe. But the stench of it just seems to cling to the air.  It’s dark in the cell.

This letter, and many others like it, raised public awareness about the day-to-day goings on inside Armagh as the 32 protesting women were subjected to increasingly poor food, little to no interaction with fellow prisoners, unpleasant temperatures, violence at the hands of their guards, and an accumulation of stress due to the worsening conditions of their surroundings.

The defining condition for the women's dirty protest, however, had not to do with bathing or using the toilet, but with the menstrual cycle.  While Ireland and the world was appalled at how the men at Long Kesh were living day in and day out, the presence of such an intimate and inherently sexual bodily fluid direct contrasted with the pure, model Irish women which Irish Republican activists were intended to illustrate.  Indeed, even the mention of menstruation caused outrage in the guards and other men who came into contact with the issue, whether in person or in passing:

"I’ve taken my period’ she said simply.  “I need some sanitary napkins and a wash.” He looked at her with disgust.  “Have you no shame? I’ve been married twenty years and my wife wouldn’t mention things like that.”  What is the color of shame?  All she could see was red as it trickled down her legs.”

When the public was made aware that the women were being forced to smear their blood on the walls along with their excrement and urine because of a lack of sanitary napkins being provided to them, most reacted in disgust and disbelief, pointing to this as further proof that women did not belong in prison because they were obviously, naturally more “delicate.”  In addition, the presence of blood was believed to provide more opportunity for health risks and disease transmission than the other bodily waste.

Pauline McLoughlin

One of the notable figures of the dirty protest, Pauline McLoughlin, a 19-year-old from Derry. She was arrested and held on remand in Armagh before being sentenced in 1978 for being complicit in the murder of a British soldier. As an initial member of the protest, Pauline lived in the unsanitary conditions from the first days and, because of a previously existing stomach condition, became increasingly ill as time went on. After having lost all of her prison privileges as a member of the dirty protest, Pauline was suddenly unable to receive the packages of food which had kept her sustained and began to vomit continuously after every prison meal. Between the poor food and the  conditions she found herself living in, Pauline's weight quickly dropped from 9.5 stone to around 6 stone. On 18 March, a prison doctor cautioned that, should she not be given medical attention immediately, she would most likely die and she was subsequently declared unfit for punishment and sent to the hospital to recover. After an incomplete recovery, Pauline was returned to Armagh where her condition worsened again, causing her to be sent back to the hospital; this was a pattern that would continue for multiple trips.
 
Upon hearing of Pauline's condition, the public immediately began to protest the treatment of her poor health, which was blamed on her “voluntary” involvement in the dirty protest by prison officials and doctors.  The activists group called the Women of Imperialism issued a pamphlet advocating for Pauline's return to health and an improvement of prison conditions by juxtaposing a picture of a healthy Pauline pre-arrest with the following description of her condition:

She landed in the hospital so dehydrated that eight bags of special fluid had to be drip fed into her to stop her heart [from] collapsing.  Yet one week later Pauline was back in her cell in Armagh prison.  Her condition was still undiagnosed and untreated… At the age of 23 her hair is grey, her teeth rotting and falling out. She has dizzy spells and blackouts if she tries to walk. Weighing just over 5 stone, she looks like the victim of a famine—too thin even to sit in one position for any length of time."

Eventually, Pauline was convinced by her fellow dirty protesters to cease her role in the protest to save her dangerously failing health.

According to secret government papers released thirty years later,

"There has been some talk, at least among the campaign organisers, of the women in Armagh joining the hunger strike. In fact the [IRA] leadership have never shown much interest in what the women are up to but have left them to the feminist movement. However, they may consider it worth bringing in the women at a later stage and it is also quite possible that the women will take the decision themselves precipitately. the death of Pauline McLoughlin (sic] or indeed her release, would give the women a new emphasis."

Public Opinion

General

Like all other prison protests, a large aspect of the women's dirty protest centred on their ability to raise public awareness of their situation and to recruit the public's support in their mission to change and improve prison conditions.  In general, public support was behind the protesting women, most significantly by virtue of their position as women.  At this time, Irish women were perceived by their fellow countrymen to be the bastions of virtue and goodness that was commonly recognised as "Mother Ireland" and, as a result of this, were generally thought to not belong in prison, despite their active nature in armed republican operations in increasing numbers since 1972.

This disapproving attitude toward female imprisonment only grew when the public was made aware of the conditions that the women were living in, especially when it came to the presence of menstrual blood in the cells. The idealistic impression of Irish women required that their sexuality be pushed into the background of their identity, viewed only as pure beings rather than as humans with desires and urges.  With the presence of such a sexualised object, however, the "little girls" were transformed into women, an idea that the public (especially the Irish public) was uncomfortable with and which they blamed upon the prison system and the conditions it kept the women in.

Feminist

Initially, feminists were divided on the issue of whether or not to support the protesting women of Armagh.

While it couldn't be denied that these women were suffering incredibly at the hands of a mostly male police force, the fact that these women belonged to a very particular political group, one which was in strict opposition to beliefs held by a significant number of feminist activists in Ireland at that time, complicated the issue. The defining question of the feminist response was this: Was this protest being held as a republican protest act, or was it more accurately to be described as a female-driven reaction against the oppression of a certain group of women against their mistreatment at the hands of a patriarchal penal system and the male guards who surrounded them?

It was generally accepted that while the women identified themselves as part of the larger Long Kesh dirty protest because they all claimed membership in the IRA and worked for the Irish Republican cause, they were instead a direct reaction to the sexist abuse suffered in prison. To this effect, many feminists found themselves supporting the Armagh women in their protest, especially convinced by a letter smuggled out from the prisoners on the issue of the feminist nature of the protest:

It is a feminist issue in so far as we are women, even though we are treated like criminals.  It is a feminist issue when the network of this jail is completely geared to male domination.  The governor, the assistant governor, and the doctor are all males.  We are subject to physical and mental abuse from the male screws [prison guards] who patrol our wing daily, continually peeping into our cells.  If this is not a feminist issue, then we feel that the word feminist needs to be redefined to suit these people who feel that "feminist" applies to a certain section of women rather than encompassing women everywhere, regardless of politically held views.

Groups such as the Women Against Imperialism and the Belfast Women's Liberation Group united to support these women, defining their mistreatment as an essentially feminist issue, while other groups refused to endorse the women as a reaction against both the political nature of their crimes and as a refusal to endorse the ways in which they chose to protest their conditions

Irish Republican

The attitudes towards women within the Irish republican movement were only beginning their transformation from conservatism towards a more accepting, liberal gender-equal view when the Armagh dirty protest began in 1980. At the time of the protest the IRA, where few women were considered actual members of the rebel group, were faced with issues of gender equality, and the generally accepted belief of Irish society indicated that women should be relegated to their "fitting" role within the household, where they were to properly raise their children and support their husbands' efforts within the IRA.

It was for these reasons that the IRA and its political wing Sinn Féin initially acted to discourage a dirty protest among the Irish republican women. Once the protest began, however, the IRA and Sinn Féin acted to support the women in any way possible, using their publications and media powers to propagandise for the women's rights, portraying women as a vital and large part of Irish republicanism and activist history, and encouraging the women to stay strong in their difficult protest.

It is important to note, however, that the support given by the IRA and other Irish republicans was often portrayed in a sexist, male-centered way, from describing the protesting women as "very pretty" and "stylish" to depicting their actions as forced upon them, with the women as victims, rather than as an act of free will and rabid determinism. In addition, the constant referral to the protesters as "girls" rather than "women" diminished their portrayed power within both the protest and the movement; rather than being autonomous adults, they were being depicted as small children, not only asexual, but without a powerful will.

Catholic Church

At a time when the Catholic Church was viewed as a significant player in the Northern Ireland conflict, it became necessary that Church officials offer their opinions on the women and their unconventional activism.  Like conventional Irish society, the Catholic Church viewed women as necessarily and naturally "weaker" than their male counterparts and, as a result of this weakness, unfit for life within prison walls.  In addition, the Church advocated for the proper placement of women within the home where they were to care for their children and their husbands.  Clearly, their detainment at Armagh removed these women from their homes, a travesty according to the Church, and one which, should the British government have any sense of humanity, could only be solved with the women's release from prison.

While publicly supporting the efforts of these "helpless" women and speaking out against their living conditions, the Catholic Church issued several pamphlets which contained statements from priests who had personally visited with the women as well as statements from the protesting women themselves.  In late February 1980, Father Denis Faul issued a pamphlet declaring the following:

To deliberately organise a large group of men to beat a group of helpless women who are imprisoned and helpless is would appear to be an action of peculiar heinousness.  To do this on women who are imprisoned and helpless is worse, to misrepresent the truth about it is worse still, and to punish further the unfortunate women who have been beaten severely and indecently is the worst of all.

After the Protest

Ending of the Protest

The Armagh dirty protest came to an end in February 1981, a full year after the protest had begun. While a hunger strike had commenced and been called off prematurely in December 1980 (three Armagh women being actively involved in the strike) due to the believed fulfilment of the Long Kesh prisoners' "Five Demands,” it was soon realised that these demands has, in fact, not been met. As a result, a new hunger strike was planned for the beginning in March 1981.  To help with the prioritisation of and directing attention to this protest, the women of Armagh called off their dirty protest.

After the dirty protest ended, the women continued their no-work protest and were still denied the Special Category Status.  Indeed, some conditions within the prison worsened, as the use of strip searching the prisoners became an increasingly frequent occurrence, especially when prisoners were travelling to or from the prison itself.  This invasive technique, meant to prevent prisoners from smuggling illegal goods into the prison and correspondence out of it, also served as a demoralising tactic, robbing the women of their most intimate privacy and dignity at the hands of both male and female wardens.

See also

 Cumann na mBan

References 

1980 in Northern Ireland
1981 in Northern Ireland
1980 protests
1981 protests
Politics of Northern Ireland
Protests in Northern Ireland
The Troubles (Northern Ireland)
Feminism in Ireland
Irish republicanism